

Review and events

Monthly events
This is a list of the significant events to occur at the club during the 2009–10 season, presented in chronological order. This list does not include transfers, which are listed in the transfers section below, or match results, which are in the results section.

June:
16 – Coventry City draw Hartlepool United at home in the League Cup First Round.
17 – Coventry City's fixtures for the 2009–10 Championship season are announced
18 – Midfielder Kevin Thornton is banned from driving for 22 months for multiple driving offences.
24 – 2009 FA Cup Finalists Everton have agreed to face Coventry City for Marcus Hall's testimonial.
26 – Defender Marcus Hall signs new one-year contract, keeping him at the club until 2010.
29 – Curtis Wynter, Adam Walker, Ashley Cain and Jermaine Grandison sign one-year contracts, their first professional contracts.

July:
14 – Stephen Wright is named new club captain for the 2009–10 season, taking over from Scott Dann.
21 – Coventry City announce the new squad numbers for the forthcoming season.
27 – Academy player Conor Thomas is called up to the England Under-17 squad for the first time – for the Nordic Cup.
29 – Academy player Conor Thomas wins his first England Under-17 cap against Denmark Under-17 in the Nordic Cup.
31 – Defender Jordan Clarke signs two-year contract, his first professional contract.

August
17 – Stephen Wright is named in the Official Football League Championship team of the week, following his performances against Barnsley and Doncaster Rovers.

September
2 – Jordan Clarke is called up to the England Under-19 squad for the first time in a friendly against Russia Under-19 .
8 – Jordan Clarke wins his first England Under-19 cap in a friendly against Russia Under-19.
28 – Leon Best is named in the Official Football League Championship team of the week, following his performance against Middlesbrough.

October
3 – Leon Best is named the September Football League Championship Player of the Month.
5 – Sammy Clingan is named in the Official Football League Championship team of the week, following his performance against Leicester City.

November
29 – Coventry City draw Portsmouth away in the FA Cup Third Round.
30 – Richard Wood is named in the Official Football League Championship team of the week, following his performance against Queens Park Rangers.

December
14 – Freddy Eastwood is named in the Official Football League Championship team of the week, following his performance against Peterborough United.

January
3 – If Coventry City get past Portsmouth they have drawn Sunderland at home in the FA Cup Fourth Round.
21 – David Bell's goal against Doncaster Rovers is voted Sky Blues' 2009 Goal of the Year.

February
9 – Chris Coleman is fined £1,000 for improper conduct following his outburst after the Sky Blues defeat to Ipswich Town in January.
22 – Keiren Westwood is named in the Official Football League Championship team of the week, following his performance against Crystal Palace.

March
1 – Sammy Clingan is named in the Official Football League Championship team of the week, following his performance against Scunthorpe United.
8 – Jon Stead is named in the Official Football League Championship team of the week, following his performance against Peterborough United.
9 – Coventry City announce that at the end of the season the deal current sponsors Cassidy Group will end and they will seek a new sponsor.
15 – Michael McIndoe is named in the Official Football League Championship team of the week, following his performance against Plymouth Argyle.
16 – Callum Wilson is named the March League Football Education Apprentice of the Month.
16 – Callum Wilson, Nathan Cameron, Michael Quirke and Shaun Jeffers are offered their first professional contracts.
22 – Keiren Westwood wins South Wales Supporters' Club's Player of The Season Award for 2009/2010.
26- Coventry City announce they have signed a £1 million, three-year sponsorship deal with City Link, starting with the 2010/2011 season.

April
7 – Keiren Westwood wins Irish Supporters' Club Player of The Season Award for 2009/2010.
8 – Michael Quirke wins Under 18 Player of The Season Award for 2009/2010.
12 – Former Coventry City captain Charlie Timmins passes away following a long battle with cancer.
17 – Keiren Westwood wins London Supporters' Club Player of The Season Award for 2009/2010.
26 – Aron Gunnarsson is named in the Official Football League Championship team of the week, following his performance against Middlesbrough.

May
3 – Clinton Morrison wins Community Player of The Season Award for 2009/2010.
3 – Jordan Clarke wins Young Player of The Season Award for 2009/2010.
3 – David Bell wins Goal of The Season Award for 2009/2010 for his strike against Crystal Palace.
3 – Clinton Morrison wins Top Scorer Award for 2009/2010.
3 – Keiren Westwood wins Player' Player of The Season Award for 2009/2010.
3 – Keiren Westwood wins Player of The Season Award for 2009/2010.
4 – Chris Coleman is relieved of his duties as manager with immediate effect.
14 – Striker Shaun Jeffers signs his first professional contract, a one-year deal running until June 2011.
14 – Defender Jermaine Grandison signs new one-year contract, keeping him at the club until 2011.
17 – Striker Callum Wilson signs his first professional contract, a one-year deal running until June 2011.
20 – Aidy Boothroyd is appointed as new Coventry City manager, signing a three-year contract.
21 – Defender Nathan Cameron signs his first professional contract, a one-year deal running until June 2011.
24 – Coach and reserve team manager Frankie Bunn leaves The Sky Blues after his contract expires.

Squad details

Players info

Matches

Pre-season friendlies

Championship

League Cup
First Round

FA Cup
Third Round

Third Round Replay

Championship data

League table

Results summary

Round by round

Aggregate Scores

Season statistics

Starts & Goals

|}
Note: Player substitutions are not included.

Goalscorers

Assists

Yellow cards

Red cards

Captains

Penalties Awarded

Suspensions served

Monthly & Weekly Awards

End of Season Awards

Overall

Transfers

Transfers in

Transfers out

Loans in

Loans out

Kit profile

|
|
|}

References

External links
 Official Site: 2009/2010 Fixtures & Results
 BBC Sport – Club Stats
 Soccerbase – Results | Squad Stats | Transfers

Coventry City
Coventry City F.C. seasons